Hot Springs were a Canadian psychedelic indie-rock band based in Montreal, Quebec. They were unusual in the Montreal music scene, in that they had an equal fan-base within both the francophone and anglophone communities.

History
Formed in the spring of 2004, Hot Springs featured Giselle Webber on vocals and guitar, Rémy Nadeau-Aubin on guitar, Frédéric Sauvé on bass and Anne Gauthier on drums (previously Karine Lauzon).

Hot Springs released their first EP, Rock Partouze in 2005. The band's track "Caco Disco" hit No. 1 on the local college charts, and they received MIMI (Montreal Independent Music Initiative) nominations in both the EP and Rising Star categories, and a number of radio and television spots within the francophone media circuit.

The band's first, and only, full-length album, Volcano was released on September 18, 2007, under Quire Records.

In October, 2008, Hot Springs disbanded when lead singer/songwriter Webber chose not to continue.

Discography

EPs
Rock Partouze (2005)
 Bacteria
 Bet Number Two
 Ici
 Caco Disco
 Kalamata

Albums
Volcano (2007)
 Headrush
 Cellophane
 Fog and the Horn
 Tiny Islands
 Fantôme Dinosaure
 Pink Money
 Annimystique
 Gotta DJ
 Hary and Airee
 38th Adventure

See also

Music of Quebec
Canadian rock
List of Canadian musicians
List of bands from Canada
:Category:Canadian musical groups

References

External links
Official Website 
Myspace Page

Musical groups established in 2004
Musical groups disestablished in 2008
Canadian indie rock groups
Musical groups from Montreal
2004 establishments in Quebec
2008 disestablishments in Quebec